The Minardi PS02 was a Formula One racing car with which Minardi contested the 2002 Formula One season.

Overview
The PS02 was designed by technical director Gabriele Tredozi and chief aerodynamicist Loic Bigois, who had joined the team from the now defunct Prost team. The car was recognised as a significant step forward from the PS01, and the team utilised extensive wind tunnel testing in Italy and the United Kingdom.  The car utilised the Minardi's unique titanium cased gearbox, and changed to a pushrod from pullrod suspension for the first time.  The PS02 featured the new Asiatech AT02 V10 engine which would be dropped for the 2003 season in favour of Cosworth.

The PS02 was launched in Kuala Lumpur, Malaysia in February 2002.  Owing to support from the state tourism authority and lottery, Magnum.  The shakedown took place at Imola Circuit, with Alex Yoong at the wheel.

The season started well for the team.  New driver Mark Webber scoring two points finishing fifth at the season opening Australian Grand Prix.  Ahead of the significantly higher funded Toyota team.  This was Minardi's first points scoring car since 1999, when Marc Gené scored one point at the European Grand Prix.

However, Australia was a highlight of an otherwise poor season for Minardi.  The PS02 suffered from a total of 14 race retirements, of which 4 were related to the Asiatech V10.  Additionally, rookie Yoong failed to qualify the car on three separate occasions, falling foul of the 107% rule.  This caused Minardi to replace him for two races with British American Racing test driver, Anthony Davidson.  Ultimately, Davidson, would retire from both races.

In Spain, neither car started the Grand Prix.  A manufacturing error in the front wing caused Webber's to fail during qualifying, meanwhile team mate Yoong had an incident that caused a red flag.  Whilst repairs were made overnight, including flying the wing between Catalunya and Faenza, owner Paul Stoddart withdrew both cars from Sunday's Grand Prix.

Minardi struggled for finance throughout the season. Before the season even began, owner Stoddart legally challenged the French court over a decision to sell Prost Grand Prix to fellow team owner Tom Walkinshaw, in order to protect his team's television rights money.  In August, British newspaper The Daily Telegraph reported that Stoddart was due to sell the team to a consortium led by Irish businessman Brendan McGuinness and Saudi Prince Al-Waleed bin Talal.  However this did not materialise. By the season close, Stoddart's business European Aviation who also sponsored the team in 2002, was on the verge of sale although it was not to fund the team.  Financial difficulties from 2002, followed the team into 2003 where Stoddart was suing three sponsors for non-payment and Yoong chased $200,000 in unpaid wages.

Minardi finished the season 9th in the Constructors' Championship, equal on points with Toyota team and now defunct Arrows Grand Prix.

Livery 
The PS02 kept the black colour scheme of its predecessor, with minor portions of red. The car featured sponsorship from the Malaysian government, displaying Go KL logos on the sidepods and engine covers. European Aviation and Magnum also remained as major sponsors.

Complete Formula One results
(key)

References

External links
Technical details for the Minardi PS02

Minardi Formula One cars